Pana Tinani is an island in the Louisiade Archipelago in Milne Bay Province,  Papua New Guinea.

Geography
The island has an area of 78 km2, making it the sixth largest island of the Louisiade Archipelago. The island is hilly, rising to 338 m at Mt. Guyuba.
The island is 3.1 km north of Vanatinai, and separated from it with the Bulami Channel. It is also 100 meters east of Nigao, the easternmost island in the Calvados Chain. separated with the Magamaga Channel.

History
The island was discovered in the late 18th century, named after the wife of the explorer Joannett.

Population
At the census of population in 2014, the island had 740 inhabitants, spread across 11 villages. 
The main town is Bwailahina (formerly Hebwaun) on the southeast coast.
The island's population is administered by 2 wards : Nimoa Ward, Wanim Ward.

References

Islands of Milne Bay Province
Louisiade Archipelago